Absent Light is the fourth studio album by metalcore band Misery Signals and was released on July 23, 2013. The album was produced by guitarists Greg Thomas and Ryan Morgan, a first for the band. The album cover was illustrated by Adam Rosenlund. This is the band's last album with vocalist Karl Schubach.

Background
The band's previous album, Controller was released in 2008. The band would tour in support of the album for nearly a year before going on hiatus to focus on other projects. Vocalist Karl Schubach formed a solo project called Solace and launched a Kickstarter to help fund the project. As part of the funding incentives, Schubach provided vocals on a song by the UK metalcore band The Divided.

Guitarist Ryan Morgan and bassist Kyle Johnson formed the hardcore punk band Burning Empires with members of Fall Out Boy. Rhythm guitarist Stuart Ross and drummer Branden Morgan formed the post-hardcore band Lowtalker with members of Comeback Kid. Ross would leave Misery Signals in 2010, becoming the vocalist for UK pop punk band Living with Lions, becoming tired of performing heavy metal. Later that year, Johnson would leave Misery Signals as well.

Following the departure of Ross and Johnson, the remaining members of the band released a statement that Misery Signals had not broken up. In early 2012, the band released a cover of the Pink Floyd song "Us and Them" for the video game Homefront. The song was released for free download on March 22, 2012. The following month, Schubach released a series of tweets that the band was practicing again and working on new material. The band launched an Indiegogo campaign to help fund the upcoming album.

The band released the song "Luminary" on July 3, 2013.

Track listing

Personnel 
Misery Signals
Karl Schubach – lead vocals
Ryan Morgan – lead guitar, backing vocals
Greg Thomas – rhythm guitar
Kyle Johnson – bass
Branden Morgan – drums

Additional personnel
Produced by Greg Thomas and Ryan Morgan
Mixed by Steve Evetts
Mastered by Alan Douches
Additional Production by Will Putney
Additional Engineering by Eric Rachel, Karl Schubach, Chris Teti, Andrew Glover and Adam Capps
Assisted by Randy Leboeuf and Kris Yates
Preproduction Engineered by Kevin Arndt
 Guest vocals on "Carrier" by Matthew Mixon of 7 Angels 7 Plagues
 Guest vocals on "Lost Relics" by Todd Mackey of With Honor
 Guest vocals on "Everything Will Rust" by Fredua Boakye of Bad Rabbits
 Orchestral string movements composed by Greg Thomas and Randy Slaugh
 Strings arranged and produced by Randy Slaugh
 String sessions engineered by Ken Dudley
 Violin: Juliann Eldridge, Emily Dixon
 Viola: Kelsey Georgeson
 Cello: Sara Cerrato, Samaquias Lorta
 Percussion: Rick Morgan
 Additional programming: Brian Southall, Dave Swanson
 Crew vocals: Kyle Kearney, Daniel Graves, Chris Teti, Blane Christenson, Johnny Perrin, and Brady Murphy

References 

2013 albums
Misery Signals albums